Andy McGhee (November 3, 1927 – October 12, 2017) was a tenor saxophonist and educator.

Career
McGhee graduated from New England Conservatory in 1949 and worked for a short time with trumpeter Roy Eldridge and local Boston musician Fat Man Robinson. After marrying in 1950, he served in the Army in Korea and at Fort Dix, New Jersey where he played in an Army band and gave lessons to other musicians. From 1957–1963 he worked in Lionel Hampton's band, touring the United States, Europe, and the Far East. His composition "McGhee" can be found on The Many Sides of Lionel Hampton. McGhee worked with Woody Herman from 1963 to 1966.

McGhee joined the faculty of Berklee College of Music in 1966. Among his students were saxophonists Bill Pierce, Javon Jackson, Donald Harrison, Antonio Hart, Sam Newsome, Richie Cole, Greg Osby, and Ralph Moore. While devoting his time to teaching, McGhee wrote the instruction books Improvisation for Saxophone and Flute: The Scale/Mode Approach and Modal Strategies for Saxophone.

On March 15, 1978, he performed with Lionel Hampton and the Lionel Hampton Alumni Band as part of the Boston Globe Jazz Festival. The band included Bob Wilber, clarinet, Ernie Wilkins, saxophones, Teddy Wilson, piano, Alan Dawson and Terri Lynne Carrington, drums and Hampton on vibraphone. The performance marked the 50th anniversary of the start of Lionel Hampton's career as a professional musician.

In the early 1990s, McGhee toured with Lionel Hampton as member of the Golden Men of Jazz tour. The band featured Harry "Sweets" Edison, Clark Terry, Benny Bailey, Al Grey, and Benny Golson. The Golden Men of Jazz played concerts throughout Europe and on returning to the United States played for President George H. W. Bush in Washington, D.C.

In May 2006, McGhee was awarded an Honorary Doctorate of Music from Berklee College of Music.

Discography

As leader
 Could it Be (Mags, 1992)

As sideman
With Lionel Hampton
 Hamp's Big Band (Audio Fidelity, 1959)
 Golden Vibes (Columbia, 1959)
 The Many Sides of Hamp (Glad-Hamp, 1961)
 The Exciting Hamp in Europe (Glad-Hamp, 1962)
 Live! (Glad-Hamp 1979)

With Woody Herman
 My Kind of Broadway (Columbia, 1964)
 The Swinging Herman Herd-Recorded Live (Philips, 1964)
 Woody's Winners (Columbia, 1965)
 Woody's Big Band Goodies (Philips, 1965)
 The Jazz Swinger (Columbia, 1966)
 Woody Live East and West (Columbia, 1967)
 Live in Antibes 1965 (France's Concert, 1988)

References

1927 births
2017 deaths
American jazz tenor saxophonists
American male saxophonists
American music educators
American male jazz musicians
20th-century American saxophonists
People from Wilmington, North Carolina